Tomislav Šarić (born 24 June 1990) is a Croatian footballer who plays as a midfielder for Latvian club FK RFS.

Club career

Inter Zapresic
Šarić is a product of the Inter Zaprešić youth academy, debuting for their first team in 2008, aged 18. Becoming a standard fixture in the club's first team, he was made captain in 2012. He went on the collect more than 100 caps in the four years he spent at the club.

Crotone
In April 2013, Serie A team Parma signed Šarić on a free transfer. In July 2013 Šarić was signed by Crotone in Serie B in a co-ownership deal in a 3-year contract, for €200,000, with Alessandro Ligi (50% rights for €150,000), Denílson (50% rights for €200,000) and Francesco Checcucci (100% rights for €200,000) moved to Parma. In June 2014 the co-ownership was renewed. However, in summer 2014 it was terminated in favor Crotone for free, with Denílson and Alessandro Ligi moved to Parma outright, for €200,000 and €300,000 respectively.

On 26 August 2014 Šarić was loaned out to Italian club Pistoiese. In July 2015, he arrived at NK Osijek on a one-year loan.

Later years
On 13 June 2016 Šarić was signed by Split on a 2-year contract. After having made a single appearance for Split, he returned to his former club Inter Zaprešić on 31 August 2016. In June 2018, he switched to Latvian club Riga FC.

Career statistics
As of 26 May 2013

International career
He is also capped at Croatia U21.

References

External links
 

1990 births
Living people
People from Brežice
Croatian footballers
Croatian expatriate footballers
Association football midfielders
Croatia under-21 international footballers
NK Inter Zaprešić players
Parma Calcio 1913 players
F.C. Crotone players
U.S. Pistoiese 1921 players
A.C. Savoia 1908 players
NK Osijek players
RNK Split players
Riga FC players
FK RFS players
Croatian Football League players
Serie B players
Serie C players
Latvian Higher League players
Croatian expatriate sportspeople in Italy
Croatian expatriate sportspeople in Latvia
Expatriate footballers in Italy
Expatriate footballers in Latvia